The men's football tournament at the 1993 South Asian Games was held from 11 to 18 December in Bangladesh.

Fixtures and results

Group A

Group B

Medal Matches

medal match

medal match

Winner

References

External links
 RSSSF - 6th South Asian Federation Games 1993 (Dhaka, Bangladesh)

1993 South Asian Games
1993 South Asian Games